The Samarra culture is a Late Neolithic archaeological culture of northern Mesopotamia, roughly dated to between 5500 and 4800 BCE. It partially overlaps with Hassuna and early Ubaid. Samarran material culture was first recognized during excavations by German Archaeologist Ernst Herzfeld at the site of Samarra. Other sites where Samarran material has been found include Tell Shemshara, Tell es-Sawwan, and Yarim Tepe.

At Tell es-Sawwan, evidence of irrigation—including flax—establishes the presence of a prosperous settled culture with a highly organized social structure. The culture is primarily known for its finely made pottery decorated with stylized animals, including birds, and geometric designs on dark backgrounds. This widely exported type of pottery, one of the first widespread, relatively uniform pottery styles in the Ancient Near East, was first recognized at Samarra. The Samarran Culture was the precursor to the Mesopotamian culture of the Ubaid period. At Tell Sabi Abyad and other Late Neolithic sites in Syria, scholars adopt increasingly vague terms such as Samarra "influenced", Samarra-"related" or even Samarra "impulses", largely because we do not understand the relationships with the traditional Samarra heartlands. The term may be extended to include sites in Syria such as Tell Chagar Bazar, Tell Boueid II, Tell Sabi Abyad or Tell Halula, where similar pottery is currently being excavated in Pre-Halaf to Early Halaf Transitional contexts.

Samarra ware 
The ceramic of this culture is named Samarra ware.

See also
Desert Kites
Hassuna culture
History of Mesopotamia

References

Further reading
 

 
6th-millennium BC establishments
5th-millennium BC disestablishments
Archaeological cultures of the Near East
Ancient Upper Mesopotamia
Neolithic cultures of Asia
Late Neolithic